The 490th Missile Squadron is a United States Air Force unit.  It is assigned to the 341st Operations Group, stationed at Malmstrom AFB, Montana.   The 490 MS is equipped with the LGM-30G Minuteman III Intercontinental ballistic missile, with a mission of nuclear deterrence.

The squadron was first activated in the China-Burma-India Theater during World War II.  It served in combat until V-J Day.  Following the war, it returned to the United States, where it was inactivated.   The squadron was again activated in 1955 as a Boeing B-47 Stratojet unit of Strategic Air Command until inactivating in 1961.  The following year, it activated in its current role as the 490th Strategic Missile Squadron.

History

World War II
Activated as a North American B-25 Mitchell medium bomber squadron at Karachi, India, 16 September 1942, assigned to 341st Bombardment Group, which was activated the day before. Cadre personnel were drawn from 11th Bombardment Squadron and other units in India. After receiving full complement of ground support personnel 1 December 1942, Ground Echelon began transfer to Camp Moire, Ondal (Aandal), India 30 December. Air Echelon transferred 1 February 1943 with first combat mission on 18 Feb. Operating under Tenth Air Force for next two years, squadron primarily performed interdiction missions against Japanese lines of communications as well as supporting British ground forces in Burma during 1943 and 1944.  The squadron interrupted combat operations and flew supplies from Chittagong, India to Allied Forces defending Imphal, India between 20 May and 30 June 1944 before resuming combat operations. 490th Bomb Squadron developed and perfected bridge destroying bombing technique and became known as "Burma Bridge Busters."  Assumed secondary role of dropping leaflets over Burma for the United States Office of War Information from, January–March 1945.  Reassigned to Fourteenth Air Force in China; beginning combat operations in China on 16 April 1945; squadron interdicted enemy lines of communication and supported Chinese ground forces until the end of the war.

Personnel demobilized in India, squadron returned to the United States and inactivated as a paper unit.

Strategic Air Command
Was reactivated in 1955 as a Strategic Air Command Boeing B-47 Stratojet squadron . Trained in air refueling and strategic bombardment operations with the B-47. in 1961, the squadron began transferring its B-47s to other SAC wings and became non-operational.

Intercontinental Ballistic Missile Squadron
Reactivated on 1 May 1962 as an ICBM squadron assigned to the 341st Missile Wing at Malmstrom Air Force Base, Montana.  Initially equipped with 50 LGM-30A Minuteman Is in early 1962, becoming SAC's third operational Minuteman ICBM squadron.   Upgraded to the Minuteman IB in 1964; Minuteman IIF, in 1967.   Received control of LGM-30G Minuteman III silos from inactivating 321st Strategic Missile Wing at Grand Forks Air Force Base, North Dakota in 1996; Minuteman IIs being retired.  Has maintained ICBMs on alert ever since.

In 2010 The United States Air Force Global Strike Command started again with their famous competitions to bring back the glory days of the 1960s. The Global Strike Challenge was hosted at Barksdale Air Force on November 16 and 17. The 490th Missile Squadron sent Captain Kevin Hullihan and 1Lt Brian J. Marlow to compete in this competition. The crew achieved the best score in Emergency war orders, resulting in earning the Neary Trophy.

Lineage
 Constituted as the 490th Bombardment Squadron (Medium) on 14 August 1942
 Activated on 15 September 1942
 Redesignated 490th Bombardment Squadron, Medium on 1 August 1943
 Inactivated on 2 November 1945
 Redesignated 490th Bombardment Squadron, Light on 11 March 1947
 Activated in the reserve on 4 April 1947
 Inactivated on 27 June 1949
 Redesignated 490th Bombardment Squadron, Medium on 7 June 1955
 Activated on 1 September 1955
 Discontinued and inactivated on 25 June 1961
 Redesignated 490th Strategic Missile Squadron (ICBM-Minuteman) and activated on 18 December 1961 (not organized)
 Organized on 1 May 1962
 Redesignated 490th Missile Squadron''' on 1 September 1991

Assignments 
 341st Bombardment Group, 15 September 1942
 Tenth Air Force, 25 October 1943 (attached to 341st Bombardment Group until c. 7 January 1944)
 341st Bombardment Group, 7 May-2 November 1945 (attached to 312th Fighter Wing for operational control, 7 May until c. 25 Aug 1945)
 341st Bombardment Group, 4 April 1947 - 27 June 1949
 341st Bombardment Wing, 1 September 1955 - 25 June 1961
 Strategic Air Command, 18 December 1961 (not organized)
 341st Strategic Missile Wing, 1 May 1962
 341st Operations Group, 1 September 1991 – present

Stations

 Camp Malir, Karachi, India, 15 September 1942
 Moire Camp, Ondal, India, 5 January 1943 (operated from Chakulia Airfield, India, 20–25 May 1943)
 Kurmitola Airfield, India, 25 May 1943
 Dergaon, India, 26 August 1944
 Moran, India, 20 October 1944
 Warazup, Burma, 29 November 1944

 Hanchung Airfield, China, 13 April – 13 September 1945
 Detachment operated from Hsian Airfield, China, 16 April – 4 August 1945
 Camp Kilmer, New Jersey, 1–2 November 1945
 Dow Field (later Dow Air Force Base), Maine, 4 April 1947 – 27 June 1949
 Abilene Air Force Base (later Dyess Air Force Base, Texas), 1 September 1955 – 25 June 1961
 Deployed to Andersen Air Force Base, Guam, 9 January – c. 3 April 1958
 Malmstrom Air Force Base, Montana, 1 May 1962 – present

See also

 List of United States Air Force missile squadrons

References

Notes

Bibliography

External links
 341st Operations Group Fact Sheet

490
Military units and formations in Montana